The 1975 BC Lions finished in fifth place in the Western Conference with a 6–10 record and failed to make the playoffs.

With Don Moorhead injured, Peter Liske took most of the snaps during the season for the Lions.  The club had a terrible start to the season going 1–5 in their first six games and on August 29 the Board of Directors finally fired both General Manager Jackie Parker and Head Coach Eagle Keys.  

Bob Ackles was promoted to General Manager and Ackles elevated Cal Murphy to Head Coach.  The club went 5-5 in the remaining part of the season, however, they did not get out of last place in the Western Conference.

Despite the poor season by the club, three Lions made the CFL all-star team:  Centre Al Wilson, Defensive End Bill Baker and linebacker Larry Cameron.

Byron Bailey was elected to the Football Hall of Fame.

Regular season

Season standings

Season schedule

Offensive leaders

Awards and records

1975 CFL All-Stars
C – Al Wilson, CFL All-Star
DE – Bill Baker, CFL All-Star
LB – Larry Cameron, CFL All-Star

References

BC Lions seasons
1975 Canadian Football League season by team
1975 in British Columbia